HR, Hr or hr may refer to:

Arts and media

Film and television
 H.R. Pufnstuf, a children's television series from 1969
 HR, a 2013 television drama starring Alicia Silverstone
 HR, a criminal organisation in the American TV series Person of Interest

Other media
 HR (girl group), Japan
 Hessischer Rundfunk (Hessian Broadcasting), Germany
 Homestar Runner, an Internet cartoon
 HyperRogue, a roguelike video game

Fictional characters 
 H. R. Wells, a character from The Flash television series

Business and finance
 Human resources, personnel
 Human resource management
 Ukrainian hryvnia, currency

Government and politics
 Human rights
 High Representative of the Union for Foreign Affairs and Security Policy of the European Union
 United States House of Representatives

Languages
 hr (ISO 639-1 code) for the Croatian language
 , a two-letter combination used in some languages
 Reduction of /hr/ to /r/ in Old/Middle English

People
 H.R. (born 1956), lead singer of American band Bad Brains
 Himesh Reshammiya (born 1973), Indian singer

Places
 HR (ISO 3166-1 code) for Croatia
 HR postcode area, UK, covering six post towns around Hereford, England
 Hampton Roads, a region of south-eastern Virginia
 IN-HR (ISO 3166 code) for Haryana, a state in North India

Religion
 HR, an honorific abbreviating His Reverence or Her Reverence

Science and technology

Biology and medicine
 HR (gene), encoding protein hairless
 Haemodynamic response, delivery of blood to tissues
 Heart rate
 Homologous recombination, in genetics
 Hypersensitive response, of plants to infection
 Hydroxyethylrutoside, a class of drugs

Computing
 , an HTML element
 .hr, Internet code for Croatia
 HR (software), mathematical theory generator
 Half Rate (HR or GSM-HR), a speech coding system

Other uses in science and technology
 Hazard ratio
 Hertzsprung–Russell diagram (H-R, HRD), in astronomy and astrophysics
 High-resolution high-definition (HRHD, HR, HRHDTV or HR.HDTV) image resolution
 Hour (hr)
 HR, Bright Star Catalogue prefix
 Nissan HR engine

Sports
 Home run in baseball

Transportation
 Former Scots Highland Railway
 Hahn Air, IATA airline code
 Holden HR, a car 1966-1968
 Haryana Roadways State Transport, India